The 1945–46 IHL season was the first season of the International Hockey League, a North American minor professional league. Four teams participated in the regular season, and the Detroit Auto Club won the Turner Cup.

Regular season

Turner Cup-Playoffs

External links
 Season 1945/46 on hockeydb.com

IHL
IHL
International Hockey League (1945–2001) seasons